Fathabad Rural District is in the Central District of Khatam County, Yazd province, Iran. At the National Census of 2006, its population was 2,753 in 710 households. There were 2,793 inhabitants in 722 households at the following census of 2011. At the most recent census of 2016, the population of the rural district was 2,319 in 702 households. The largest of its 85 villages was Fathabad, with 497 people.

References 

Khatam County

Rural Districts of Yazd Province

Populated places in Yazd Province

Populated places in Khatam County